Birthama obliquifascia is a moth of the family Limacodidae first described by George Hampson in 1893. It is found in Sri Lanka, and India.

Adults are sexually dimorphic. Female much larger and heavier. Forewing fasciation is more distinct in female. Caterpillar with light leaf-green body. Surface of body smooth and perfect semiovoid. Small, thinly brown-ringed disc-like tubercles or dots present. When disturbed, the caterpillar produce a fluid from tubercles. A thin, indistinct white dorsal line is present. Pupation occurs in a smooth fat short chalky-white ovoid cocoon. The larval host plant is Carallia.

References

Moths of Asia
Moths described in 1893
Limacodidae